Om Bikram Rana is the 19th IGP of Nepal. In September, 2006, he was appointed Inspector General of Nepal Police, the highest police rank of Nepal Police. He was preceded by Shyam Bhakta Thapa as the police chief and was succeeded by Hem Bahadur Gurung. His term had begun on September 18, 2006 and had ended in September 2008.

He was sentenced to two years in prison for corruption by the Supreme Court in the Sudan Armoured Police Carrier Carrier scam.

References

Living people
Year of birth missing (living people)
Nepalese police officers
Chiefs of police
Inspectors General of Police (Nepal)
Rana dynasty
People of the Nepalese Civil War
21st-century Nepalese nobility
20th-century Nepalese nobility